Ted Elsby (January 3, 1932 – November 5, 1985) was a Canadian football player who played professionally for the Montreal Alouettes.

References

1985 deaths
1932 births
Montreal Alouettes players